The 2021–22 Coppin State Eagles men's basketball team represented Coppin State University in the 2021–22 NCAA Division I men's basketball season. The Eagles, led by fifth-year head coach Juan Dixon, played their home games at the Physical Education Complex in Baltimore, Maryland as members of the Mid-Eastern Athletic Conference.

Previous season
The Eagles finished the 2020–21 season 9–13, 8–4 in MEAC play to finish as MEAC North division co-champions, alongside Norfolk State. In the MEAC tournament, they were defeated by Morgan State in the semifinals.

Roster

Schedule and results

|-
!colspan=12 style=| Non-conference regular season

|-
!colspan=12 style=| MEAC regular season

|-
!colspan=9 style=| MEAC tournament

Sources

References

Coppin State Eagles men's basketball seasons
Coppin State Eagles
Coppin State Eagles men's basketball
Coppin State Eagles men's basketball